Theresa Hope Spivey (born July 27, 1971) is a former gymnast. While at Georgia, she won the Honda-Broderick Award as the nation's top female gymnast in 1991. She currently resides in the Valdosta, GA area where she owns a gym. She competed for the United States national team at the 1988 Summer Olympics. She was inducted into the Georgia Sports Hall of Fame in Feb. 2015.

References

1971 births
Living people
American female artistic gymnasts
Olympic gymnasts of the United States
Gymnasts at the 1988 Summer Olympics
Sportspeople from Norfolk, Virginia
Pan American Games medalists in gymnastics
Pan American Games gold medalists for the United States
U.S. women's national team gymnasts
Gymnasts at the 1987 Pan American Games
21st-century American women
Georgia Gym Dogs gymnasts
NCAA gymnasts who have scored a perfect 10